Nebraska Highway 10 is a highway in Nebraska.  Its southern terminus is at the Kansas border south of Franklin.  Its northern terminus is at an intersection with Nebraska Highway 58, Nebraska Highway 92, and Recreation Road 82B in Loup City.

Route description
Nebraska Highway 10 begins at the Kansas border south of Franklin.  This terminus is also the northern terminus of K-8.  It continues north through farmland and after a brief turn northwest, turns north into Franklin.  In Franklin, it meets U.S. Highway 136.  It continues northward, staying on the same line until it meets U.S. Highway 6 and U.S. Highway 34 in Minden.  It continues north where it meets Interstate 80 at interchange 279. From there it runs west, concurrently, with Interstate 80 to interchange 275, just east of the Great Platte River Road Archway Monument. Highway 10 then crosses over US 30 at a grade separation with access provided by Link 10-F just to the north. It continues north past Kearney Regional Airport before turning west where it meets Nebraska Highway 40 north of Kearney. Here, it turns north again, goes through Pleasanton, then meets Nebraska Highway 2 at Hazard.  It turns northeast, then east and continues in that direction until an intersection with Nebraska Link 82A, then turns north.  It proceeds north until ending in Loup City at an intersection with Nebraska Highway 92 and Nebraska Highway 58.

Former alignment
In November 2016, the East Kearney Bypass was officially opened to traffic. This replaced the former route of Highway 10 which crossed I-80 at interchange 279 to meet US 30 east of Kearney. It then ran west, concurrently, with US 30 into Kearney before departing north along 2nd Avenue at the intersection of US 30 and Highway 44 where it continued north along its present route.

Major intersections

References

External links

The Nebraska Highways Page: Highways 1 to 30
Nebraska Roads: NE 1-10

010
Transportation in Franklin County, Nebraska
Transportation in Kearney County, Nebraska
Transportation in Buffalo County, Nebraska
Transportation in Sherman County, Nebraska